Cho Jae-hyun (born June 30, 1965) is a South Korean film, stage, and TV actor. He is commonly dubbed "director Kim Ki-duk's persona" since Cho has starred as leading and supporting characters in a number of films directed by Kim.

Early years and education
Cho Jae-hyun was born in Gyeongju on June 30, 1965. He and his family lived in a poor neighborhood on the slopes of a hill until his father became successful with his restaurant business in the Jongno area, Seoul. In a 2002 interview with the film magazine Cine21, Cho said he was a rebellious boy wandering outside the home. He aspired to be a painter, so tried to enter an art high school but failed. When he entered another high school, Cho ran away from home to Busan. Cho worked as a waiter there, and studied on his own to pass a qualification exam equivalent to obtaining a high school diploma. However, Cho failed it, so returned to Seoul to finish his high school year.

Cho was admitted to study theater and film at Kyungsung University. Cho recollected he indulged himself in Busan's culture as a freshman and sophomore, then focused on theater for the rest of his university years. Cho said a question from his junior in school during his third summer break shook him to rethink about his future; "What would you do after the graduation from the school?" Cho said he felt shame at the time because he could not clearly answer the question. Therefore, Cho started dedicating himself to acting.

Acting career
After graduation, Cho was selected as a TV actor by a public recruit of Korea Broadcasting System (KBS), and officially debuted as a professional actor by starring as the youngest brother of Yu In-chon in The Age of Ambition (야먕의 세월). But theater remained his main priority, as Cho and his friends established a theatrical company named "Jongak" (종각, literally "Bell Pavilion"), which produced several works on the stage such as Tricycles (세발자전거, 1989), Look Back in Anger (성난 얼굴로 돌아보라, 1990) and The Lovers of Woomook-baemi (우묵배미의 사랑, 1990). In 1991, Cho won Best New Actor in Theater at the Baeksang Arts Awards for his acting in Equus; he reinterpreted the leading role Alan Strang as an innocent person, though he is largely depicted as a cruel and rebellious character.

In 2009, Cho revisited Equus by directing the play and playing the other lead character Martin Dysart. This was part of the highly successful Yeongeuk Yeoljeon ("A Series of the Best Plays"), of which Cho was the programmer in 2008-2009. Cho was praised for reinvigorating the faltering local theater scene in Daehangno by coming up with the series and its star-studded casting, promotion and marketing.

In 2018, Cho starred as a doctor and head of an organ transplant centre in the medical TV series Cross opposite Go Kyung-pyo. However, on February 24, 2018, while the TV series was still being shot and aired, he was removed from the cast list following his admission of committing sexual harassment.

Other activities
Cho is also the chairman of the Gyeonggi Film Council since 2009, executive festival director of the DMZ International Documentary Film Festival (DMZ Docs) since 2009, chairman of the Gyeonggi Arts Center since 2010, an associate professor at Sungshin Women's University's College of Convergence Culture and Arts since 2012, and an associate professor at Kyungsung University's Department of Theater and Film since 2014.

Personal life
When Cho Jae-hyun was 24 years old in 1989, he married his college sweetheart who was an anchor for the campus channel. His son Cho Soo-hoon is a short track speed skater who won a gold medal in the 500 meter competition for male university students at the 2008 Korean National Winter Sports Festival, while his daughter Cho Hye-jung, who attended the American Academy of Dramatic Arts in New York City, is also an actress.

Sexual assault
On February 23, 2018, Cho Jae-hyun was accused of sexual misconduct by actress Choi Yul, who claimed that Cho had sexually assaulted her in the past. On February 24, Cho acknowledged the allegations.

In July 2018, a woman only known as "miss A" filed a  lawsuit against Cho for 300 million ₩ as damages from an alleged sexual assault. The Seoul Central District Court ruled against her in January 2021.

Filmography

Film

As actor

As director

Television series

Theater

Awards and nominations

References

External links
 
 
 

1965 births
Living people
People from Gyeongju
South Korean male film actors
South Korean male television actors
South Korean male stage actors
Chung-Ang University alumni
Kyungsung University alumni
Best New Actor Paeksang Arts Award (film) winners